Friedrich August Albert Holste, known as August Fred Holste, (September 8, 1874 – ?) was an American football player and coach. He served as the head football coach at Rose Polytechnic Institute—now known as Rose-Hulman Institute of Technology—in 1903 and Fairmount College–now known as Wichita State University in 1904. Holste played college football at the University of Chicago, where he was a member of the undefeated 1899 Chicago Maroons football team. Holste coached at Morgan Park Academy in Chicago 1902.

Holster served as the head coach at the University of Wisconsin–Whitewater in 1900 and Denison University in 1901.

References

1874 births
Year of death missing
American football quarterbacks
Chicago Maroons football players
Denison Big Red football coaches
Fargo Hilltoppers football coaches
Hastings Broncos football coaches
Rose–Hulman Fightin' Engineers football coaches
Wichita State Shockers baseball coaches
Wichita State Shockers football coaches
Wisconsin–Whitewater Warhawks football coaches
High school football coaches in Illinois
Sportspeople from Cook County, Illinois